USC Heidelberg, for sponsorship reasons named MLP Academics Heidelberg, is a professional basketball club from Heidelberg, Baden-Württemberg, Germany. The club's men's senior team currently plays in the German first division Basketball Bundesliga since its promotion in 2021. The team has won thirteen German championships in its history, the last being in 1977.

History

A Triumphant Legacy
The team was dominant in the 1950s and 1960s, as well as in the West German Basketball League, winning a total of 9 German championships (1957–1962, 1966, 1973, 1977).

In the 2020–21 season, Heidelberg won its first-ever ProA championship and gained promotion to the first level Basketball Bundesliga (BBL).

Return to the Basketball Bundesliga (2021-present)
Heidelberg finished the 2021–22 Basketball Bundesliga season with 11 wins and 23 losses in 15th place out of 18, after surprisingly winning their first three Bundesliga games. With that cushion, the underdog was always able to stay out of the relegation spots despite the losing streak that followed.

Despite the success in 2021-22, Heidelberg changed its head coach for the 2022/23 season and brought in six new players.

Branislav Ignjatovic had served as head coach for eight years. In 2022, the Finish head coach Joonas Iisalo then took over. He came from Telekom Baskets Bonn, where he assisted his brother Tuomas as an assistant coach. The brothers' team had taken Bonn from a medium power to second place and qualified for the playoff semifinals. The Iisalos' tactics were known for a lot of passing.

As in the promotion season, the goal for the second year was to stay in the league, according to general manager Matthias Lautenschläger.

Brekkott Chapman joined the Japanese team Koshigaya Alphas. Robert Lowery and Kelvin Martin left Heidelberg without a new team. Albert Kuppe, Phillipp Heyden and Courtney Stockard ended their professional careers. Kuppe cited mental and physical reasons for his decision.  Kuppe's departure was a surprise, which is why Leon Friederici, who was actually scheduled to leave, returned to the team. 

For the 2022/23 season, Tim Coleman (32), who last played for the Crailsheim Merlins in 2021, joined Heidelberg.

Eric Washington came from Niners Chemnitz as Heidelberg's new floor general. As playmaker he would "create opportunities, especially in transition, after blocks and from isolation" and "play defensively with commitment and passion," said new Heidelberg head coach Joonas Iisalo.

Further, Lukas Herzog joined Heidelberg from MHP Riesen Ludwigsburg. In Ludwigsburg, the youngster had been known for his work ethic and defense. Both qualities let him accumulate many minutes there.

With Akeem Vargas, Heidelberg acquired the former captain of BG Göttingen. Vargas returned to play in his hometown of Heidelberg.

The new recruit Elias Lasisi had already played with the then assistant coach Joonas Iisalo for Crailsheim.

Another recruit was Power forward De'jon Davis (24). 
Niklas Würzner's contract was extended until 2024.

Logos and names

TB Heidelberg (1947–1953)
USC Heidelberg (1953–present)
MLP Academics Heidelberg (2012–present)

Arenas

During the majority of the club's existence, Heidelberg played at the Olympiastützpunkt Rhein-Neckar, where it was based from 1972. In 2021, the club entered the newly built SNP Dome, which has a capacity of 5,000 spectators. On 25 March 2021, the inaugural game in the arena was played against the Eisbären Bremerhaven.

In late December 2022, Heidelberg played against FC Bayern Munich in the nearby SAP Arena (Mannheim), where the team drew a record crow of 10,454 visitors. For each ticket sold, a donation was made to the Courage Foundation for the support of chronically ill children.

Players

Current roster

Depth chart

Notable players
To appear in this section a player must have played at least two seasons for the club AND either:
– Set a club record or won an individual award as a professional player.
– Played at least one official international match for his senior national team at any time.

Trophies
German Championship / Basketball Bundesliga
Champions (9): 1956–57, 1957–58, 1958–59, 1959–60, 1960–61, 1961–62, 1965–66, 1972–73, 1976–77
BBL-Pokal
Winners (2): 1977, 1978
ProA (II)
Champions (1): 2020–21

Season by season

Head coaches
 Markus Jochum (2000-2007)
 Uwe Sauer (2011-2012)
 Anthony Garbelotto (2012-2014)
 Branislav Ignjatovic (2014–2022)
 Joonas Iisalo (2022–present)

References

External links

Presentation at eurobasket.com

 
Basketball teams established in 1952
Basketball clubs in Baden-Württemberg
Basketball in Heidelberg